Kendriya Vidyalaya No.1, Bhubaneswar was started in 1967 as a small school at Unit-I Boy's High School of Bhubaneswar. After approximately one year of operation, a new campus was constructed at unit-IX. Since 2005, the school has operated as a two shift school. It received NABET accreditation from 2012 to 2016 and received the British Council International School Award in 2013.

Facilities and activities 
The school's courses include physics, chemistry, biology, biotech, mathematics, geography and language labs. It has one gymnastic facility, spacious playgrounds, and e-classroom facilities.
It prepares the students of Class X and XII for CBSE examinations AISSE and AISSCE. The school also has a Primary Resource Room, Computer Rooms with TV, LCD and OHP facilities, gardens, and a library. Activities include: Inter-school and Inter-state games, Scouts and Guides, co-curricular activities, Inter-school cultural talent competition like science exhibition, SST exhibition etc. It has over 4100 students (both shifts).

See also
Capital High School, Bhubaneswar
Kendriya Vidyalaya
Kendriya Vidyalaya Ganeshkhind

References

External links 
 

1967 establishments in Orissa
Schools in Bhubaneswar
Educational institutions established in 1967
Kendriya Vidyalayas